Bicyclus aurivillii is a butterfly in the family Nymphalidae. It is found in the Democratic Republic of the Congo, Uganda, Rwanda and Burundi.

Subspecies
Bicyclus aurivillii aurivillii (border between the Democratic Republic of the Congo and Uganda)
Bicyclus aurivillii kivuensis (Joicey & Talbot, 1924) (north-eastern Democratic Republic of the Congo, south-western Uganda, Rwanda, Burundi)

References

Elymniini
Butterflies described in 1896
Butterflies of Africa
Taxa named by Arthur Gardiner Butler